The 2014–15 Binghamton Bearcats women's basketball team will represent Binghamton University during the 2014–15 NCAA Division I women's basketball season. The Bearcats were led by first year head coach Linda Cimino and play their home games at Binghamton University Events Center. They are members of the America East Conference. They finished the season 4-26, 2-14 in America East play in a tie for an eighth-place finish. They lost in the quarterfinals of the 2015 America East women's basketball tournament to Maine.

Media
All home games and conference road games will stream on either ESPN3 or AmericaEast.tv. Most road games will stream on the opponents website. All games will be broadcast on the radio on WNBF and streamed online.

Roster

Schedule

|-
!colspan=12 style="background:#006B54; color:#FFFFFF;"| Exhibition

|-
!colspan=12 style="background:#006B54; color:#FFFFFF;"| Regular season

|-
!colspan=12 style="background:#FFFFFF; color:#006B54;"| 2015 America East tournament

See also
2014–15 Binghamton Bearcats men's basketball team

References

Binghamton Bearcats women's basketball seasons
Binghamton